Karmyudh is a 1985 Indian Hindi-language film directed by Swaroop Kumar, starring Mithun Chakraborty, Anita Raj, Pran, Amrish Puri.

Plot

Cast

Mithun Chakraborty as Inspector Vijay Kumar
Anita Raj as Usha Saxena 
Pran as Charan Singh Deol 
Amrish Puri as Sohanlal Puri
Parveen Babi as Herself 
Asha Sachdev as Lily 
Krishan Dhawan as Albert (Lily's Father)
Kumud Chhugani as Beena
Bharat Kapoor as Shakti 
Tej Sapru as Rakesh Saxena (Usha's Brother) 
Dheeraj Kumar as Kundan 
Ashalata Wabgaonkar as Geeta 
Sudhir Dalvi as Inspector Bali 
Rabia Amin as Sheela
Viju Khote as Havaldar Aayaram 
Birbal as Havaldar Gayaram
Kamaldeep as Malkani
Ramesh Deo as Judge
Bob Christo as Bob
Arun Govil as Rajesh 
Jankidas as Jankidas 
Moolchand as Heeralal 
Rajan Haksar as Sohanlal Puri's associate
Yunus Parvez

Soundtrack
Lyrics: Anjaan

References

External links
 

1985 films
1980s Hindi-language films
Indian action films
Films scored by Bappi Lahiri
1985 action films